Binary Synchronous Communication (BSC or Bisync) is an IBM character-oriented, half-duplex link protocol, announced in 1967 after the introduction of System/360.  It replaced the  synchronous transmit-receive (STR) protocol used with second generation computers. The intent was that common link management rules could be used with three different character encodings for messages. Six-bit Transcode looked backwards to older systems; USASCII with 128 characters and EBCDIC with 256 characters looked forward.  Transcode disappeared very quickly but the EBCDIC and USASCII dialects of Bisync continued in use.

At one time Bisync was the most widely used communications protocol and is still in limited use in 2013.

Framing 
Bisync differs from protocols that succeeded it in the complexity of message framing. Later protocols use a single framing scheme for all messages sent by the protocol.   HDLC, Digital Data Communications Message Protocol (DDCMP), Point-to-Point Protocol (PPP), etc. each have different framing schemes but only one frame format exists within a specific protocol. Bisync has five different framing formats.

ACK0 and ACK1 (even/odd affirmative acknowledgement) are encoded as two characters—DLE '70'x, and DLE / for EBCDIC, DLE 0 and DLE 1 for USASCII, DLE - and DLE T for Transcode. WABT (wait before transmit) was encoded as DLE ", DLE ?, or DLE W.

All  frame formats begin with at least two SYN bytes. The binary form of the SYN byte has the property that no rotation of the byte is equal to the original.
This allows the receiver to find the beginning of a frame by searching the received bit stream for the SYN pattern. When this is found, tentative byte synchronization has been achieved. If the next character is also a SYN, character synchronization has been achieved. The receiver then searches for a character that can start a frame. Characters outside of this set are described as "leading graphics". They are sometimes used to identify the sender of a frame.  Long messages have SYN bytes inserted approximately every second to maintain synchronization.  These are ignored by the receiver.

A normal block ending character (ETB or ETX) is followed by a check sum (block check character or BCC). For USASCII, this is a one character longitudinal redundancy check (LRC); for Transcode and EBCDIC, the check sum is a two character cyclic redundancy check(CRC).  A data frame may contain an intermediate check sum preceded by an ITB character.  This ability to include intermediate check sums in a long data frame allows a considerable improvement of the error detection probability. USASCII  characters are also transmitted using odd parity for additional checking.

Pad characters are required following a line turn-around—NAK, EOT, ENQ, ACK0, ACK1.  If the transmission ends with EOT or ETX the pad follows the BCC.  This pad is either all '1' bits or alternating '0' and '1' bits.  The next transmission begins with a pad character which can be either of the above or a SYN.

An optional heading containing control information can precede data in a frame.  The content of the heading is not defined by the protocol but is defined for each specific device.  The heading, if present, is preceded by an SOH (start of heading) character and followed by an STX (start of text). 
 
Text data normally follows the heading, begun by the STX, and terminated by ETX (end of text) or ETB (end transmission block).

Normal data frames do not allow certain characters to appear in the data. These are the block ending characters: ETB,  ETX and ENQ and the ITB and SYN characters.  The number of unique characters that can be transmitted is therefore limited to 59 for Transcode, 123 for USASCII, or 251 for EBCDIC.

Transparent data framing provides an unrestricted alphabet of 64, 128 or 256 characters.
In transparent mode block framing characters such as ETB, ETX, and SYN are preceded by a DLE character to indicate their control significance (The DLE character itself is represented by the sequence DLE DLE).  This technique became known as  character stuffing, by analogy with bit stuffing.

Link control 
The link control protocol is similar to STR. The designers attempted to protect against simple transmission errors.  The protocol requires that every message be acknowledged (ACK0/ACK1) or negatively acknowledged (NAK), so transmission of small packets has high transmission overhead. The protocol can recover from a corrupted data frame, a lost data frame, and a lost acknowledgment.

Error recovery is by retransmission of the corrupted frame. Since Bisync data packets are not serial-numbered, it's considered possible for a data frame to go missing without the receiver realizing it. Therefore, alternating ACK0s and ACK1s are deployed; if the transmitter receives the wrong ACK, it can assume a data packet (or an ACK) went missing. A potential flaw is that corruption of ACK0 into ACK1 could result in duplication of a data frame.

Error protection for ACK0 and ACK1 is weak. The Hamming distance between the two messages is only two bits.

The protocol is half-duplex (2-wire). In this environment, packets or frames of transmission are strictly unidirectional, necessitating 'turn-around' for even the simplest purposes, such as acknowledgments. Turn-around involves 
 the reversal of transmission direction,
 quiescing of line echo,
 resyncing.
In a 2-wire environment, this causes a noticeable round-trip delay and reduces performance.

Some datasets support full-duplex operation, and full-duplex (4-wire) can be used in many circumstances to improve performance by eliminating the turn-around time, at the added expense of 4-wire installation and support. In typical full-duplex, data packets are transmitted along one wire pair while the acknowledgements are returned along the other.

Topology
Much Bisync traffic is point-to-point. Point-to-point lines can optionally use contention to determine the master station.  In this case one device can transmit ENQ to bid for control.  The other device can reply ACK0 to accept the bid and prepare to receive, or NAK or WABT to refuse.  In some cases connection of a terminal to multiple hosts is possible via the dial telephone network.

Multi-drop is part of the initial Bisync protocol. A master station, normally a computer, can sequentially poll terminals which are attached via analog bridges to the same communication line.  This is accomplished by sending a message consisting only of an ENQ character addressed to each device in turn.  The selected station then transmits a message to the master or reply with EOT to indicate that it has no data to transmit.

Bisync applications 

The original purpose of Bisync was for batch communications between a System/360 mainframe and another mainframe or a Remote Job Entry (RJE) terminal such as the IBM 2780 or IBM 3780. The RJE terminals support a limited number of data formats: punched card images in and out and print line images to the terminal. 
Some non-IBM hardware vendors such as Mohawk Data Sciences used Bisync for other purposes such as tape-to-tape transmission. A programmer can easily emulate an RJE terminal or other device.

IBM offered assembler language macros to provide programming support. During the System/360 era, these access methods were BTAM (Basic Telecommunications Access Method) and QTAM (Queued Telecommunications Access Method) – which was later replaced by  Telecommunications Access Method (TCAM). IBM introduced VTAM (Virtual Telecommunications Access Method) with the System/370.

Teleprocessing monitors such as IBM's CICS and third-party software such as Remote DUCS (display unit control system) and Westi platforms used Bisync line control to communicate with remote devices.

The academic computing network Bitnet, together with connecting networks in other geographic areas, used Bisync to connect 3000 computer systems at its peak.

Financial network  S.W.I.F.T. used BSC protocol for communication between Regional Center and Institution (bank) server over leased line. In a mid-1990 BSC was replaced to the X.25 infrastructure.

Pseudo-Bisync applications

Some important systems use Bisync data framing with a different link control protocol. Houston Automatic Spooling Priority (HASP) uses Bisync half-duplex hardware in conjunction with its own link control protocol to provide full-duplex multi-datastream communication between a small computer and a mainframe running HASP. In Bisync terms, this is conversational mode.

Some early X.25 networks tolerated a connection scheme where transparent Bisync data frames encapsulated HDLC LAPB data and control packets. , several vendors encapsulate Bisync transmissions within TCP/IP data streams.

Disposition
Bisync began to be displaced in the 1970s by Systems Network Architecture (SNA) which allows construction of a network with multiple hosts and multiple programs using telecommunications.  X.25 and the Internet Protocol are later protocols which, like SNA, provide more than mere link control.

Bisync devices
A large number of devices use the Bisync protocol, some of these are:
 IBM 3270 Display Terminal Subsystem control units.
 IBM 2780 Data Transmission Terminal.
 IBM 2703 Transmission Control.
 IBM HASP workstations.
 IBM 1130 Computing System.
 IBM 2922 Programmable Terminal.

See also
Asynchronous communication

References

Further reading
Detailed discussion of Bisync link control by Charles A Wilde (new link)
  A detailed description of the protocol.
Bisync & STR programming for IBM 1130
 
 
  
 
 

Link protocols
IBM computer hardware